Ahmed Mahloof (born 26 March 1980) is a Maldivian politician currently serving as the Minister of Youth, Sports, and Community Empowerment. Mahloof is former footballer and manager of the Maldives national football team. He is now a politician who has served as MP for Galolhu-South constituency in the People's Majlis.

Mahloof resigned as an MP for Galolhu-South constituency on 17 November 2018 to assume his position as Minister of Youth, 
Sports, and Community Empowerment under president Ibrahim Mohamed Solih. He became the youngest to be appointed as a cabinet minister at the age of 38 years old.

Football career
Mahloof's boyhood passion was football. His skills were noticed early, and he went on to represent the country at the under-16, under-19 and under-23 age groups. He also played in the country's premier division for two of the strongest clubs, Club Valencia and New Radiant Sports Club.
His aspiration to build a career in sports ended prematurely with a career-ending injury in his youthful prime.

After football
After recovering from the injury, Mahloof worked as the Sports Supervisor of local primary school, Iskandhar School. In the year 2000, he joined the government as Assistant Programme Officer of the Ministry of Youth and Sports. He served in various capacities at the Ministry until his resignation in 2008. When he left government service, he was serving as Assistant Director.
He also served as Sports Supervisor at Madrasathul Ahmadhiyya, another major primary school in the capital and as Assistant Director at the Maldives Post Limited.

Politics

Youth Empowerment Activism
Mahloof's enthusiasm to work with the country's youthful population, which eventually catalyzed him to debut in politics, was fueled by his duties at the Youth Ministry. His single-mindedness and steely determination came to the fore with his successful efforts to raise funds for his skills development efforts through participation at over 30 youth workshops, seminars and camps held across the world.
His award-winning achievements include his stint at the United Nations Office for the Coordination of Humanitarian Affairs (UNOCHA), following the devastating 2004 Asian tsunami. In 2007, Mahloof was elected as the Vice Chair (and in 2008, as Chair) of the Asian Regional Youth Caucus of the Commonwealth Youth Programme. He was the first Maldivian to serve in that capacity. In 2007, Mahloof was appointed by the Commonwealth Secretary-General to join an Elections Observer Mission to Sierra Leone, for the country's presidential elections. The eight member team was chaired by the Former Prime Minister of Saint Lucia, Hon. Kenny Anthony. That was the first occasion a Maldivian had served on an overseas elections monitoring mission.

Mahloof was selected, also in 2007, to become a Delegate at the Special Youth Session held at the Commonwealth Heads of Government Meeting in Kampala, Uganda. The Delegation included ten world leaders and eight youths from across the 53 member-states of the Commonwealth. Mahloof was selected to present a paper to the Meeting delegates on youth issues, at a session chaired by the Prince Charles, Prince of Wales.
Mahloof was on the organising committee of the highly-successful Commonwealth Youth Forum of 2008. He was also on the eight-member Committee on Youth, Human Rights and Democracy, constituted by Secretary General Kamalesh Sharma.

Awards & Recognitions
On 1 March 2006, Mahloof was presented by the Government of Maldives with the National Youth Award, for his outstanding youth awareness efforts. In 2010, Mahloof was selected among the Ten Outstanding Young Persons (TOYP) Award of the Junior Chamber International (JCI).

Dhivehi Rayyithunge Party (DRP)
In a 2009 public poll by local radio station Sun FM, Mahloof was nominated as the Most Popular Parliamentarian.
With the arrival of pluralist politics in the Maldives and the subsequent establishment of political parties, Mahloof joined the Dhivehi Rayyithunge Party (DRP), led by the then President, His Excellency Maumoon Abdul Gayoom. At the Party's First National Conference, Mahloof was elected as Vice Chair of the Youth Wing. At the Second National Conference, Mahloof successfully contested for the post of Chair of the Youth Wing.
Recognising his contributions to youth welfare, President Maumoon Abdul Gayoom appointed, on 20 January 2008, to the People's Special Majlis, the Constitutional Assembly to draft a new Constitution. On 6 August 2008, Mahloof was also appointed to the People's Majlis, the Parliament. He became the youngest Member of Parliament at the time, and soon gained a reputation for his energy, determination and industry.
In 2009, Mahloof contested for the People's Majlis from his neighborhood constituency, the Galolhu South Constituency of Male'. Although he was a member of the then opposition party, DRP, and the fact that his rival from the ruling party was well funded, Mahloof registered a historic and convincing victory.

Progressive Party of Maldives (PPM)
In 2010, Mahloof found himself at the centre of a controversial rift within the DRP, which would eventually culminate in the Founder and Leader of the DRP, Former President His Excellency Maumoon Abdul Gayoom and other reformists, including Mahloof, leaving the DRP to form a brand-new political party, the Progressive Party of Maldives (PPM). Wads of money and other gifts came Mahloof's way on numerous occasions and by powerful politicians and entrepreneurs, but he remained steadfast on his principle and values and continued to uphold the will of his constituents throughout his five-year term in the Majlis.

Among his achievement as a Parliamentarian, Mahloof counts his efforts to conclude the construction of the Al-Furqan Mosque in his neighborhood. Throughout four successive presidencies, Mahloof lobbied both in the media and through consultations at the highest levels to speedily conclude the new Mosque, which the residents of Galolhu count as a major priority. He repeatedly raised the issue at parliamentary question times for Cabinet Ministers, and two of his five questions were answered by the then Minister of Islamic Affairs, Dr. Abdul Majeed Abdul Bari. He also lobbied for the mosque project at successive budgetary debates in the Majlis.
The very first Decree passed by the 17th Session of the People's Majlis was that on the welfare of residents in public flats Sinamalé and Malé Hiyaa, both of which fall into Mahloof's constituency. He proposed the Decree.
Mahloof is also credited with lobbying for an urgent solution to a health concern in his constituency in 2012. The garbage disposal site in Galolhu was situated in close proximity to a primary school, and Mahloof repeatedly met with and impressed upon senior officials of the President Dr. Waheed administration to clear the site and relocate elsewhere.
Mahloof also joined debates in the Majlis on resolving the concern of youth gang violence and other criminal matters.
A highlight of Mahloof's first term in the Majlis was his decision to forego a controversial Maldivian rufiyaa 20,000 Committee Allowance package remuneration for Parliamentarians. He proposed two decrees on the matter. Both attempts failed. He was then obliged to unilaterally refuse the payment. He was also noted for being among the MPs who did not vote in favour for additional privileges for Parliamentarians.
Mahloof's leadership roles in peaceful protests on pertinent issues of concern led him being arrested no less than 17 times.

Extracurricular activities
In addition to his love for sport, and in particular football, he also earned a reputation as a vocalist. His talents were acknowledged by a wide audience following his songs at the popular Ehandhaanugai and Tharinge Rey shows.

Football management
On 17 November 2013, Mahloof assumed charge of the Maldives national football team, the "Red Snappers", as the team's Manager.

References

1980 births
Living people
Maldivian footballers
Maldives international footballers
Club Valencia players
New Radiant S.C. players
Maldivian politicians
Maldivian football managers
Maldives national football team managers
Dhivehi Rayyithunge Party politicians
Progressive Party of Maldives politicians
Association footballers not categorized by position